Citizen Rose is a four-part American documentary television series following actress Rose McGowan, her experiences with assault in the film industry, her connection to the Harvey Weinstein sexual abuse allegations of 2017, and her role in the resulting Me Too movement. The first episode premiered on January 30, 2018, and the remaining episodes began airing in May 2018. The series premiered the same week as her memoir Brave was released. The series aired on the E! Network in the United States. It was produced by Bunim/Murray Productions.

Episodes

References

2018 American television series debuts
2018 American television series endings
2010s American documentary television series